= Machu-Picchu =

Machu-Picchu may refer to:

- Machu Picchu, a 15th-century Inca fortification in Peru
- 8277 Machu-Picchu, a main-belt asteroid
